Dow Jones is a combination of the names of business partners Charles Dow and Edward Jones.

Dow Jones & Company

Dow, Jones and Charles Bergstresser founded Dow Jones & Company in 1882. That company eventually became a subsidiary of News Corp, and publishes The Wall Street Journal among other publications.

Stock market indices

In 2010, 90% of the Dow Jones Indexes subsidiary was sold to the CME Group. Since 2012, S&P Dow Jones Indices LLC — a joint venture between S&P Global, the CME Group, and News Corp — produces, maintains, licenses, and markets stock market indices.

Among these indices are:

 Dow Jones Industrial Average, one of the most widely utilized indices of the US stock market, measuring the stock performance of 30 large companies 
 Dow Jones Transportation Average, the oldest stock index in use
 Dow Jones Utility Average, tracking the performance of 15 prominent U.S. utility companies 
 Dow Jones Global Indexes, a family of international equity indexes
 Dow Jones Composite Average, tracking 65 prominent companies
 Dow Jones Global Titans 50
See also:
 S&P 500

Sustainability indices

The Dow Jones Sustainability Indices (DJSI), launched in 1999, are a family of indices evaluating the sustainability performance of thousands of companies.

See also

Dow Jones and the Industrials, an American music band 1979–1981

S&P Dow Jones Indices